Hindustan Paper Corporation Limited Township, Panchgram is an industrial township in Panchgram under Cachar district, state of Assam. It is the finest township of the Barak Valley Under Hindustan Paper Corporation Limited (It is also called the second Shillong of Barak Valley Area).

Demographics
 India census, Hindustan Paper Corporation Ltd. Township Area Panchgram had a population of 5578. Males constitute 54% of the population and females 46%. Hindustan Paper Corporation Ltd. Township Area Panchgram has an average literacy rate of 73%, higher than the national average of 59.5%: male literacy is 79%, and female literacy is 67%. In Hindustan Paper Corporation Ltd. Township Area Panchgram, 14% of the population is under 6 years of age.

Politics
Panchgram is a part of Algapur(Lok Sabha constituency)

Transportation
The national highway NH 6 (Old NH 53) passes through the township and connects this place to Guwahati via Shillong.

Geography 
The Township area of Hindustan Paper Corporation Ltd is a hilly region with an average height of 100 m. The hills are fold mountains with rocks.

Education/School

Kendriya Vidyalaya, H.P.C Panchgram (An autonomous body of Kendriya Vidyalaya Sangathan and Ministry of Human Resource Development, Government of India)
 Shishu Niketan, H.P.C Panchgram (A unit of C.D.C, H.P.C Township Panchgram)- Before the year of 2000, this school formerly known as "Stepping Stone English School"

Clubs
 Cachar Paper Mill Employees Recreation and Welfare Club
 New Township Club
 Officers Club
 Cachar Paper Mill Ladies Club
 Children's Development Center

Unions/Associations
 Cachar Paper Mill Mazdoor Sangh (BHARTIYA MAZDOOR SANGH)
 Cachar Paper Workers and Employees Union (Recognized)
 Cachar Paper Mill Workers Union
 Cachar Paper Mill Mazdoor Union
 Cachar Paper Mill Officers and Supervisors Association
 Cachar Paper Mill SC/ST Welfare Association

Holy Spots
 Ram Mandir, Micro Area
 Kali Mandir, Central Area of Township
 Shani Mandir, Old Township Area
 Cachar Paper Mill Christian Church, Old Township Area

References

Cities and towns in Hailakandi district
Hailakandi